Zatadawbon Yazawin (also spelled Zatatawpon) is the earliest extant chronicle of Burma. The chronicle mainly covers the regnal dates of kings as well as horoscopes of select kings from Pagan to Konbaung periods. In terms of regnal years, the chronicle is considered "the most accurate of all Burmese chronicles, particularly with regard to the best-known Pagan and Ava kings, many of whose dates have been corroborated by epigraphy."

History
The chronicle was continuously updated and handed down by court historians from generation to generation. Given its inscriptionally verified regnal dates of 11th century Pagan kings, the list keeping of regnal dates probably had begun at least since the 11th century, if not earlier. The earliest portions of the chronicle appear to have written sometime in the late 13th century or the early 14th century. The original author is unknown but based on the internal text, he was a contemporary of Shin Ditha Pamauk, the diplomat and monk who led the Pagan delegation to the Mongol court in 1286–87. Furthermore, internal evidence indicates the original author first wrote the chronicle in the late Pagan or Myinsaing or Pinya periods (late 13th to early 14th centuries).

Over the following centuries, however, the original, simple chronicle of regnal lists came to be layered upon (and bookended) by religious history (and mythology). By King Minye Kyawhtin's reign (1673–98), much of the current form of the chronicle had come into existence, although later historians continued to update the regnal dates of following kings down to the last Burmese monarch Thibaw.

Organization
Zatadawbon is only one of two extant Burmese chronicles (along with Yazawin Thit) to organize itself by dynasties and periods whereas all others had been organized strictly along with the linear order of kings. Its criterion for "periodization" is the rise and fall of dynasties, and its criterion for their labeling is the capital city. Thus the Tagaung, Sri Ksetra, Pagan, Pinya, Sagaing and Ava dynasties are named after the capital cities of the dynasties.

The chronicle consists of five general sections.
 The beginning of the world system according to Buddhist mythology, its era, and the many dispensations of the Buddha
 From the first king of the world Maha Sammata, Prince Siddhattha, who becomes the historical Buddha, to King Asoka's reign right before the beginning of Burmese history. History of Sri Lankan kings is also included. The first two sections came from the standard Theravada Buddhist texts such as the Mahavamsa, the Dipavamsa and the Buddhavamsa.
 Legendary and historical origins of Burma (Myanmar), beginning with the Tagaung Kingdom, and the regnal lists of successive dynasties. The regnal list includes all the kings of Sri Ksetra, Pagan, Myinsaing, Pinya, Sagaing, Ava kingdoms, as well as Toungoo Dynasty, ending with King Narawara in 1671.
 This section covers the horoscopes, like diagrams and numerals, of 36 select kings of Pagan, Sagaing, and Ava kingdoms. Some of the kings in the list of 36 are minor/less well-known kings such as Sokkate. Konbaung historians later added the horoscopes of Konbaung kings down to the last Burmese monarch Thibaw to the original list of 36. The section also includes the astrological calculations of the founding of major cities, palaces, exemplary temples and important events such as the first time the Mongols sent an embassy to Pagan (Bagan).
 Section five has various statistical charts and data such as "the great Buddhist cities of Jambudipa", "the 16 great countries", "the 19 great capitals". It also includes a list of cities in Burma (probably in the Ava Kingdom (1364–1555)) that were required to supply fighting men and cavalrymen, lists of governors of major cities, the taxation levels of various regions, etc.

Significance
In terms of regnal years, the chronicle is considered "the most accurate of all Burmese chronicles, particularly with regard to the best-known Pagan and Ava kings, many of whose dates have been corroborated by epigraphy." This can be seen in the following comparison of the regnal dates of the early Pagan kings (from Pyinbya, the fortifier of Pagan, according to the chronicles) as reported in the three chronicles. (Note that although Zata had been available to later chroniclers, including those of the two standard chronicles, Maha Yazawin (1724) and Hmannan Yazawin (1832), the later chroniclers did not follow Zata's dates. Maha Yazawin's dates are off by at least a decade for the most part, and Hmannan's are also similarly off until at the end of Sithu I's reign (1167) at which the chroniclers of Hmannan tried to synchronize with Zata's. The Myazedi inscription, inscribed in 1112 and rediscovered in 1887, has corroborated the accuracy of Zata and disproves the dates reported in Maha Yazawin and Hmannan for kings Anawrahta to Kyansittha.)

Notes

References

Bibliography
 
 
 
 
 

Burmese chronicles
Burmese Buddhist texts
History of Myanmar